Darumbal, also spelt Dharambal, is an Aboriginal Australian language of Queensland in Australia declared extinct. It was spoken in the Rockhampton area of Queensland.  Dialects were Guwinmal, Karunbara, Rakiwara, and Wapabura. It is classified with Bayali as a Kingkel language, but the two are not close, with a low 21% shared vocabulary. Indeed, Angela Terrill states that "there is no evidence on which to base a claim of a low-level genetic group including Dharumbal with any other language".

Name

Spelling and Pronunciation
There is some variation in the naming of the language community. Walter Roth spells Ta-rum-bal and Taroombal while Norman Tindale records Dharumbal and cites the alternatives Tarumbul, Tarambol, Tarmbal and Charumbul. Nils Holmer, who undertook the first modern field study of the language uses Darumbal, as does the Darumbal-Noolar Murree Aboriginal Corporation for Land and Culture. However, Holmer also uses ⟨D⟩ to indicate an interdental stop (where others have used ⟨dh⟩), and indeed, he alphabetises Darumbal along with other words beginning with an interdental stop, making his Darumbal equivalent in pronunciation to Dharumbal. From the available material then, Angela Terrill justifiably uses Dharumbal.

Phonology

Consonant inventory

Voicing distinction of stops
Dharumbal possesses a rare distinction (among Pama-Nyungan languages) between voiced and voiceless stops, which seems to be maintained intervocalically, but not in other environments, where voicing seems to be in free variation. This observation, posited by Holmer and maintained by Terrill, is supported by the consistency to which older authors transcribed certain words; intervocalically, there is greater consistency in the use of a certain symbol, while in other environments (word-initially, after liquids), there is more variation.

Other Pama-Nyungan languages with a voicing distinction of stops include Thangatti, Marrgany-Gunya, Wangkumara, and Diyari.

Laminals
Laminal consonants are often realised interdentally, but may also be realised palatally in any position, except for the laminal nasal, which must be realised palatally in word-final position.

Laterals
Lateral consonants may not appear word-initially.

Rhotics
From the existing material, Terrill concludes that there were likely three phonemically distinct rhotic consonants: a retroflex continuant, and two trills, distinguished by voicing. The two trills only appear intervocalically and never word-initially. The (near) minimal pairs given by Stephen Wurm are:
wuru "son"
wurhu "nose"
gurru "fly"
Additional minimal pairs were observed by Holmer.

Vowel inventory

Dharumbal has three phonemic vowels. Terrill finds no evidence for contrastive vowel length. Roth used various diacritics in his transcriptions, but no explanation for their function was provided.

People
The Koinmerburra people (Koinjmal, Guwinmal) spoke the Guwinmal dialect, while the Wapabara (Woppaburra) probably spoke their own dialect.

Notes

Citations

Sources

External links 
 Bibliography of Darumbal people and language resources, at the Australian Institute of Aboriginal and Torres Strait Islander Studies

Kingkel languages
Extinct languages of Queensland